This page deals with the development of a coordinated system of college fraternities and sororities in the United States and Canada. These organizations coordinate their activities among themselves, through inter-organizational groups, like the National Interfraternity Conference and at many colleges and universities through university administrative staff assigned to coordinating activities.

For a history of the development of colleges and fraternities themselves, see History of North American college fraternities and sororities. That history encompasses the period prior to any coordinated system, and a range of organizations not included in any coordinated system.

The development of the National Interfraternity Conference.

 North American Interfraternity Conference (NIC) — association of 73 men's social fraternities; local organizations found on a single campus are usually known as "Interfraternity Councils."

Other interfraternity organizations.

 National Panhellenic Conference (NPC) — association of 26 international social women's fraternities and sororities; local organizations found on a single campus are usually known as "Panhellenic Councils."
 Fraternity Leadership Association — association of fraternities who largely resigned from membership in the North-American Interfraternity Conference.
 National Pan-Hellenic Council (NPHC) — association of 9 historically African-American fraternities and sororities; local organizations found on a single campus are usually known as "Pan-Hellenic Councils."
 National Association of Latino Fraternal Organizations (NALFO) — association of 23 Latino fraternities and sororities.
 National APIDA Panhellenic Association (NAPA) — association of 10 Asian interest fraternities and sororities.
 Concilio Interfraternitario Puertorriqueño de la Florida (CIPFI) — umbrella council for the Florida chapters of 5 Puerto Rican Greek Letter Fraternities
 National Multicultural Greek Council (NMGC) — association of 13 national and local multicultural Greek fraternities and sororities; local organizations found on a single campus are usually known as "Multicultural Councils" or "Unified Greek Councils."
 United Council of Christian Fraternities & Sororities - a council for organizations based on Christianity
 Association of College Honor Societies — association of 65 honor societies.

Banta's Greek Exchange.

Banta's Greek Exchange

William Raymond Baird.

William Raymond Baird

Baird's Manual of American College Fraternities.

Baird's Manual of American College Fraternities

The National Panhellenic Council.

National Panhellenic Council.

University Administrators and college fraternities and sororities.

It is typical for a larger university campus to have a university administrator in the Dean's Office be responsible for activities in "Greek Life".

See also
Fraternities and sororities
History of North American college fraternities and sororities

References

Fraternities and sororities in the United States